There are several municipalities in Mexico called Matamoros:
Matamoros Municipality, Chihuahua
Matamoros Municipality, Coahuila
Matamoros Municipality, Tamaulipas

See also
Matamoros (disambiguation)

Municipality name disambiguation pages